Buzara is a genus of moths in the family Erebidae.

Taxonomy
Several species now in the genus where formerly placed in the genus Dysgonia.

Species
The genus includes the following species:

Buzara chrysomela Walker, 1864 (syn: Buzara eurychrysa (Meyrick, 1889), Buzara gestroi Oberthuer, 1880)
Buzara circumducta Warren, 1912
Buzara feneratrix (Guenée, 1852)
Buzara forceps (Kobes, 1985)
Buzara frontinus (Donovan, 1805)
Buzara infractafinis (Lucas, 1894)
Buzara lageos (Guenée, 1852)
Buzara latizona (Butler, 1874)
Buzara lua (Strand, 1816)
Buzara luteipalpis (Walker)
Buzara onelia (Guenée, 1852)
Buzara propyrrha (Walker, 1858)
Buzara roulera (Swinhoe, 1909)
Buzara pseudoumbrosa 
Buzara saikehi 
Buzara umbrosa (Walker, 1865)

References
Natural History Museum Lepidoptera genus database
Genus info

Ophiusini
Moth genera